The Ōbeikei Islanders (欧米系島民, Ōbeikeitōmin lit. Westerner Islanders), are an Euronesian ethnic group native to the Ogasawara Islands. They are culturally and genetically distinct from other Japanese ethnic groups such as the Yamato, Ainu, and Ryukyuans as they are the modern-day descendants of a multitude of racial and ethnic groups including the Europeans, White Americans, Polynesians, and Kanaks who settled Hahajima and Chichijima in the 18th century.

History 

The first documented instance of human occupation of the Ogasawara Islands took place in 1830, when Matteo Mazzaro, a British citizen from Ragusa, Austria-Hungary (now Dubrovnik, Croatia), who would serve as governor, settled the island of Chichijima. He was accompanied by Nathaniel Savory, a White American from Massachusetts, John Millencamp, an American, Henry Webb and Charles Robinson, both Englishmen, Joaquim Gonsales, a Portuguese man, and approximately twenty Native Hawaiians, whose personal names were not recorded. Though Savory was American, his expedition has been commissioned by British forces, making it a British settlement.

Surnames 
 Savory (rendered as Sebori in Japanese)
 Robinson
 Washington
 Gilley
 Gonzalez

See also
Americans in Japan
 Indigenous peoples of Asia

References

Ethnic groups in Japan
Bonin Islands
Indigenous peoples of East Asia